Spit Polish is the second studio album by Tim Rogers, and the first to feature his backing band The Temperance Union. The album was released on 26 April 2004 as a digipack, and was later re-released in a standard jewel case. A vinyl LP was also pressed for sale at gigs. 'Fiction' was released as a radio single.

Track listing
"Some Fella's Heartbreaker" – 3:03
"Fiction" – 3:09
"Goldfields Blues" – 3:01
"Stray Dog Bruise" – 3:39
"Where the Wind Don't Blow" – 3:56
"The Mess" – 5:37
"Time & Distance" – 3:37
"King of the Hill" – 3:15
"I Only Understand Her in the Rain" – 4:00
"Letter to Gene" – 3:39
"Damn Songs" – 2:39
"Fun (Part One)" – 4:32
All songs written by Tim Rogers.

Personnel
Tim Rogers – guitar, vocals
Shane O'Mara – guitar
Ian Kitney – drums, percussion
Stuart Speed – bass guitar
Lisa Miller – vocals on "Damn Songs"

Charts

References

2004 albums
Tim Rogers albums